"Hate Me!" is a song by Finnish heavy metal band Children of Bodom, the song is released as the demo version of a song from their third album from Follow the Reaper. The single managed to sell platinum. There was also a Yellow 7" single released by Nuclear Blast with the same track listing. An acoustic version was played during the end of the Chaos Ridden Years documentary by Alexi Laiho with Finnish lyrics. The demo version is slightly different from the album version from Follow the Reaper.

Track listing

References

2000 singles
Children of Bodom songs
Spinefarm Records singles
Songs written by Alexi Laiho
2000 songs